A list of works and writings by Canadian author David Rakoff:

Non-fiction essays and articles
"The Waiting" (The New York Times, 15 April 2011)
"My first New York" (New York Magazine, 29 March 2010)
"All the time we have: When your therapist dies, well, how does that make you feel?" (Guilt & pleasure)
"Pardon me: my childhood bullying and an attempt to atone for it" (Tablet, September 23, 2009)
"Why 'Bruno' is bad for the gays" (Salon, July 9, 2009)
"Our True North" (The New York Times, July 1, 2009)
"Not a pet person" (O Magazine, May 12, 2009)
"Utah and the insane optimism of westward expansion" (Slate, September 10, 2008)
"The worst gay job in America" (Newmatilda.com, August 22, 2008)
"Walk This Way" (New York Times, August 16, 2008)
"The Future Knocks Again" (New York Times, July 10, 2008)
"Places and prices: Canadian Maritimes" (Condé Nast Traveller, March 2008)
"Northern Composure" (Conde Nast Traveller, March 2008)
"Love it or leave it, book excerpt" (Newsweek, January 20, 2008)
"Oh, the trouble I've Heard" (Guilt & Pleasure, Issue 5, Summer 2007)
"A Basket Case in North Carolina" (New York Times, May 20, 2007)
"Annie Hall" (Five Dials, No 3, 2007)
King of the Forest (Tablet, December 6, 2006)
"Streets of Sorrow" (Conde Nast Traveller, November 2006)
"Shrimp" (Richard Hugo House, October 14, 2006)
"75 Years: Voice and views: 'Reminders of the divine'" (The New York Times, April 23, 2006)
"Whatsizface: two Beverly Hills plastic surgeons showed me the promise of a perfect face" (Salon, November 29, 2005)
"He's Not Dead Yet" (Outside, July 2005)
"Stations of the Crawl" (New York Magazine, May 21, 2005)
"2003: The 3rd annual Year in Ideas; Makeup for men" (New York Times, December 14, 2003)
"Skin Crawling: David Rakoff faces off with the plastic surgeons of Beverly Hills" (GQ, October 2004)
"Hiroshima Bomber and Victims: This Is Your (Puppet's) Life" (New York Times, January 11, 2004)
"The Lives They Lived : Celebrity Bushman" (New York Times, December 28, 2003)
"Stores: the economy of cool" (New York Times, May 18, 2003)
"Places and prices: British Columbia Lodges" (Conde Nast Traveller, March 2003)
"Evergreen Safari" (Conde Nast Traveller, March 2003)
"Fu Fighters" (Outside, 2003)
"The Lives They lived: The Debutante's Staying-In Party" (New York Times, December 29, 2002)
"The Year in Ideas: Gizmo-finding gizmo" (December 15, 2002)
"What scares me: (fear of) being buried alive" (Outside, September 2002)
"Edie Falco's endless summer" (New York Times, July 7, 2002)
"The Year in Ideas: Unexamined Life is Worth Living, The" (December 15, 2002, New York Times)
"An Interview with The Artist: Eric Fischl" (New York Art World, October 27, 2002)
"The Year in Ideas: A to Z; focus on the negative" (New York Times, December 9, 2001)
"The Lives They Lived: 01-07-01: Mark R. Hughes, b. 1956; Death Be Not a Punch Line" (New York Times, January 7, 2001)
"Barbra's farewell: A city Verklempt" (Observer, October 1, 2000)
"I, Nature Boy" (Outside, October 2000)
"The love that dare not squeak its name: Even as a child I suspected I had something special in common with Stuart Little" (Salon, December 21, 1999)Letter to the editor including a measured response to article (Salon, December 21, 1999)
"The Writer's Life: A titan of American letters reflects on his timeless art and the sacrifices it exacts" (Salon, November 9, 1999)
"Lives: Pandora's idiot box" (New York Times, July 18, 1999)
"Glorious Gwyneth" (Salon, April 2, 1999)
"Deep Thought Oprah, That Carabiner Won't Hold: Paul Stoltz explains by anybody who isn't a climber is, well, a loser" (Outside, October 1998)
"Smells Like Tina Spirit" (New York Magazine, October 12, 1998) *"Online diary" (Slate, May 1998)
"The Critic's Eye: A Rise Is a Rise Is a Rise" (New York Magazine, April 13, 1998)
"The wizards of Id" (Salon, June 13, 1997)
"A former smoker cheers" (New York Times, April 14, 1995)
"Up. Down. Up. Down. Up. Down. Up. Down. And Then, By Golly, Up Again" (Outside, March 1998)
"About men: extraordinary alien" (New York Times, October 9, 1994)

Fiction or satire
"If Gore had won, an alternate oral history of the last decade" (Newsweek, 2010)
"Other Newfound Bloomberg FANS" (New York Magazine, November 20, 2005)
"KringleTech Worldwide Restates Earnings Existence of CEO Still in Doubt as Key Holiday Season Approaches" (Money, CNN, December 1, 2002.
"Relations: Friends and allies across the divide; Merce Cunningham and Nam June Paik" (New York Times, July 16, 2000)
"Lives; 'Sometimes you get wistful about actually looking like a person'" (New York Times, January 9, 2000)
"The Lives They Lived: Questions for James B Maas; Candid Classroom" (New York Times, January 2, 2000)
"The few. The brave. The capitalists" (Outside, June 1999)
"If the starr report were a novel, work of history, subject of moral philosophy, psychiatric case study or soap opera, WHAT KIND OF FOOTPRINT WOULD IT LEAVE?" (Outside, June 1999) 
"The Annotated Manifesto of Troop 109: The skills a boy acquires in scouting last a lifetime, without parole" (Outside, November 1998)
"Poet....Lover....Omnivore....Friend: A consideration of Bart the Bear, from those whose lives he's touched" (Outside, August 1998)
"Chekhov, Marx and synergy" (Salon, 1998)
"The 1998 Outside Prognosticator" (Outside, January 1998)
"El Nino has a Headache" (Outside, December 1997)
"Media circus: What's up, Dike?" (Salon, August 12, 1997)
"The kiss-up: a writer and his agent discuss literary strategy" (Salon, March 3, 1997)
"The Making of Fatal Death" (Outside, March 2000)
"Love, Dishonor, Marry, Die, Cherish, Perish: A Novel" (Doubleday, July 16, 2013)

Blog entries
The following entries in a blog about watching 28 Woody Allen movies in 28 days appeared in Tablet:
"Deconstructing Harry and Crimes and Misdemeanors…That's All, Folks!" (January 13, 2007)
"Interiors and Stardust Memories" (January 10, 2007)
"Zelig and The Front" (January 10, 2007)
"Take The Money and Run and What's Up, Tiger Lily?" (January 8, 2007)
"A Midsummer Night's Sex Comedy" and Another Woman (January 4, 2007)
"Manhattan" (January 7, 2007)
"Husbands and Wives and Hannah and Her Sisters" (January 3, 2007)
"Bananas and Sleeper" (January 1, 2007)
"Wild Man Blues and (not) Sweet and Lowdown" (January 2, 2007)
"Radio Days and Broadway Danny Rose" (December 31, 2006)
"Bullets Over Broadway and Everyone Says I Love You" (December 28, 2006)
"Love and Death and Everything You Always Wanted to Know About Sex (But Were Afraid To Ask)" (December 27, 2006)
"Mighty Aphrodite and Manhattan Murder Mystery" (December 26, 2006)
"Play It Again, Sam and The Purple Rose of Cairo" (December 24, 2006)
"Annie Hall" (December 22, 2006)
"I've been trying to remember, was it the Sorrow and the Pity?" (December 21, 2006)

Radio work
The following episodes of This American Life feature work by David Rakoff:
 389: Frenemies – Speak now or forever hold your peace (September 11, 2009): Rakoff demonstrates—in rhyme—how to make a wedding toast for people you never wanted to see married in the first place
 386: Fine print – Occupancy may be revoked(July 24, 2009): Rakoff drafts a legal agreement between a mother and son
 354: Mistakes were made – You're Willing to Sacrifice Our Love (April 11, 2009): Rakoff provides a re-interpretation of the famous William Carlos Williams poem
 345: Ties that bind – Fred and Barney (December 14, 2007): Rakoff as Barney's friend Fred
 343: Poultry slam 07 – The Meaning of a Bird(November 23, 2007): Rakoff explains how his life was changed – in a single evening – in a room of 5000 chickens
 328: What I learned from television – 29 (May 2, 2008): Rakoff attempts to watch 29 hours of television in one week
 305: The 'This American Life' Holiday Spectacular – Twas the Morning After (December 22, 2006): A Christmas poem by David Rakoff
 259: Promised land – Life in the Fast Lane (September 30, 2005): Rakoff fasts
 248: Like it or not – Prologue (August 12, 2005): Rakoff on an inevitable experience as a strange, round limbed, feminine little kid
 208: Office politics – Sheetcakes in the Conference Room, Whiskey After Dark(March 15, 2002): Rakoff discusses work celebrations
 194: Before and After – Watching from the River's Edge(September 21, 2001): Rakoff discusses another disaster
 192: Meet the pros – Martha, My Dear (September 14, 2007): Rakoff goes to Martha Stewart's
 169: Pursuit of Happiness – One Man's Treasure Is Another Man's Trash (September 29, 2000): Rakoff goes on a scavenger hunt
 156: What Remains – I Used To Bank Here But That Was Long, Long Ago (March 31, 2000): Rakoff tries to track down his semen
 146: Urban Nature – Interpretation of Dreams (December 10, 1999): Rakoff looks for hidden people in Iceland
 140: Family Business – What's a Grecian Urn? (September 23, 1999): Rakoff on a Greek-owned icecream parlour
 124: Welcome to America – What Do Arnold Schwarzenegger and Sigmund Freud Have In Common? (July 5, 2002): Rakoff reports on importing Austrian teachers
 118: What You Lookin' At? – Climb every mountain (March 19, 1999): Rakoff climbs a mountain in plastic shoes on Christmas day and everyone is looking at him
 65: Who's Canadian? – White like me (May 30, 1997): Rakoff on how he tried to pass as an American
 47: Christmas and Commerce (December 20, 1996): Rakoff's Christmas Freud

Rakoff also appeared on the following radio program:
Contribution to "Tales of Terror" Weekend America (October 25, 2008)* Wire tap CBC RadioOne Season 6, Into America and Season 5: Buzz pick up the phone: the best of season 5

Other media
David Rakoff on Disney's New Dream Home for The New York Times
Post-it note reading series – Seasons
Animated excerpt from the book Don't Get Too Comfortable

Rakoff, David